William Kingsmill may refer to:

 William Kingsmill (politician) (1905–1971), British politician and businessman
 William Kingsmill (priest) (died 1549), last Prior of Winchester; first Dean of Winchester, 1541–1549
 William Kingsmill (died 1618), English landowner